The 1910 Vermont gubernatorial election took place on September 6, 1910. Incumbent Republican George H. Prouty, per the "Mountain Rule", did not run for re-election to a second term as Governor of Vermont. Republican candidate John A. Mead defeated Democratic candidate Charles D. Watson to succeed him.

Marshall J. Hapgood spent $103.76 during the campaign.

Results

References

Vermont
1910
Gubernatorial
September 1910 events